The North-Eastern Rhodesia Gazette was the government gazette of North-Eastern Rhodesia.

The Gazette was published by the British South Africa Company from 17 August 1903 to 1911 at Fort Jameson when it was replaced by the Northern Rhodesia Government Gazette following the amalgamation of North-Eastern and Barotziland-North-Western Rhodesia into Northern Rhodesia.

See also
List of British colonial gazettes

References

British colonial gazettes
North-Eastern Rhodesia
British South Africa Company
Publications established in 1903
Publications disestablished in 1911
1903 establishments in North-Eastern Rhodesia
1911 disestablishments in North-Eastern Rhodesia
Northern Rhodesia